Chhan Sokhom is the former minister of justice for Cambodia.

References

Year of birth missing (living people)
Cambodian politicians
Possibly living people
Government ministers of Cambodia